Movie Madness Video is a video rental shop and museum of film history in Portland, Oregon's Sunnyside neighborhood, in the United States.

History
The store was opened by Hollywood film editor Mike Clark in 1991.

In October 2017, Hollywood Theatre launched a Kickstarter campaign to purchase and preserve the store.

See also

 List of museums in Portland, Oregon
 Scarecrow Video in Seattle, Washington
 VisArt Video in Charlotte, North Carolina

References

External links

 

1991 establishments in Oregon
Cinema museums in the United States
Companies based in Portland, Oregon
Retail companies established in 1991
Museums established in 1991
Museums in Portland, Oregon
Sunnyside, Portland, Oregon
Video rental services